A caff is a small, cheap British eatery or British cafe

It may also refer to:

Cap of Britain, a legendary king of the Britons
Caff Records, a British record label in existence between 1989 and 1992

See also
CAFF (disambiguation)